Vinu Chakravarthy (15 December 1945 – 27 April 2017) was an Indian actor, screenwriter and director who is known for acting in more than 1000 movies in Tamil, Telugu, Kannada, Badaga and Malayalam mostly as a comedian, supporting actor or in a villainous role. The 2007 released Tamil movie Muni was his landmark 1000th movie.

Early life and education 

Chakravarthy was born on 15 December 1945, in Usilampatti to Adimoola Thevar and Manjuvani Ammal. He studied at Wesley School, Royapettah and graduated in commerce from A. M. Jain College. He was eldest son among other 3 sons and a daughter.

Career 

On completion of his education, Chakravarthy worked as a Reserve Sub-Inspector at the Ice House police station for six months before joining the Southern Railways where he worked for four years.

Chakravarthy was working as a script writer for Kannada director Puttanna Kanagal when he was noticed by film producer Tiruppur Mani who, in 1977, gave him a role in the Kannada film Parasangada Gendethimma which was later remade into Tamil as Rosappu Ravikkaikari (1979) with Chakravarthy returning. Since then, Chakravarthy made over 1,000 films in four South Indian languages - 900 in Tamil, 30 in Malayalam, 5 in Telugu and one in Badaga language. He also directed movies on his own and is credited with introducing Silk Smitha.

Partial filmography

Actor

Tamil 

 Vaayai Moodi Pesavum (2014)
 Desingu Raja (2013)
 Pollachi Mappillai (2010)
 Muni (2007)
 Manase Mounama (2007)
 Ilakkanam (2006)
 Giri (2004)
 Settai (2004)
 Vayasu Pasanga (2004)
Arul (2004)
Anbe Un Vasam (2003)
 Banda Paramasivam (2003)
 Student Number 1 (2003)
 Chokka Thangam (2003)
 Sundhara Travels (2002)
 Thenkasi Pattanam (2002)
 Gemini (2002)
 Alli Arjuna (2002)
 Pandavar Bhoomi (2001)
 Lovely (2001)
 Kunguma Pottu Gounder (2001)
 Sri Raja Rajeshwari (2001)
 Anbudan (2000)
 Parthen Rasithen (2000)
 Good Luck (2000)
 Amarkalam (1999)
 Unnai Thedi (1999)
 Poo Maname Vaa (1999)
 Unakkaga Ellam Unakkaga (1999)
 Sivappu Nila (1998)
 Kannathal (1998)
 Kumbakonam Gopalu (1998)
 Veeram Vilanja Mannu (1998)
 Nilaave Vaa (1998)
 Dharma (1998)
 Ninaithen Vandhai (1998)
 Bhagavath Singh (1998)
 Periya Manushan (1997)
 Arunachalam (1997)
 Mappillai Gounder (1997)
 Sundara Purushan (1996)
 Kaalam Maari Pochu (1996)
 Coimbatore Mappillai (1996)
 Thirumbi Paar (1996)
 Valli Vara Pora (1995)
 Thottil Kuzhandhai (1995)
 Manathile Oru Paattu (1995)
 Nattamai (1994)
 Pondattiye Deivam (1994)
 Varavu Ettana Selavu Pathana (1994)
 Veera (1994)
 Rasa Magan (1994)
 Moondravadhu Kann (1993)
 Sinna Mapplai (1993)
 Maharasan (1993)
 Naalaiya Theerpu (1992)
 Annamalai (1992)
 Unna Nenachen Pattu Padichen (1992)
 Thambikku Oru Pattu (1991)
 Marikozhundhu (1991)
 Vetri Karangal (1991)
 Sathya Vaakku (1990)
 Athisaya Piravi (1990)
Vaazhkai Chakkaram (1990)
 Panakkaran (1990)
 Mappillai (1989)
 Dravidan (1989)
 Dharma Devan (1989)
 Thangamana Raasa (1989)
 Manidhan Marivittan (1989)
 Kai Veesamma Kai Veesu (1989)
 Siva (1989)
 Rajadhi Raja (1989)
 Enne Petha Raasa (1989)
 Rayilukku Neramachu (1988)
 Guru Sishyan (1988)
 Manithan (1987)
 Velicham (1987)
 Enakku Nane Needipathi (1986)
 Amman Kovil Kizhakale (1986)
 Karimedu Karuvayan (1986)
 January 1 (1984)
 Thambikku Entha Ooru (1984)
 Manaivi Solle Manthiram (1983)
 Gopurangal Saivathillai (1982)
 Vandichakkaram (1980)
 Rosappu Ravikkaikari (1979)

Malayalam 
 Sangham (1988)
 Kauravar (1992) as Police Inspector
 Maanyanmar (1992) as Police Inspector
 Meleparambil Aanveedu (1993) as Veeramuthu Goundar
 Kambolam (1994) as Murukarajan Goundar
 Rajadhani (1994) as Rajamanikyam Nadar
 Rudraksham (1994) as CI Rao
 Maanikyachempazhukka (1995)
 Kidilol Kidilam (1995)
 Lelam (1997) as Andipatti Thevar
 Nadan Pennum Nattupramaniyum (2000) as Perumal
 Thenkashippattanam (2001)
 Achane Aanenikkishtam (2002)
 Sthithi (2003)
 Masanagudi Mannadiyar Speaking (2004)
 Samsaaram Aarogyathinu Haanikaram (2014)

Television
Balachander in Chinnathirai - Manjal Nila (Raj TV)
Agni pravesam (Jaya TV)

Writer
Vandichakkaram (1980)
Koyil Puraa (1981)
Ponnuketha Purushan (1992)

Controversies 

Chakravarthy criticised television and film producer Ekta Kapoor for her depiction of Silk Smitha in The Dirty Picture, a biographical film on the actress. He also expressed displeasure over Kapoor's choice of casting. He also said Smitha had wide expressive, inviting eyes, which Vidya Balan does not have.

References

External links 
 

1945 births
2017 deaths
Tamil comedians
Male actors in Tamil cinema
Tamil male actors
Male actors in Malayalam cinema
Indian male film actors
Indian male comedians
People from Madurai district
Male actors from Tamil Nadu
Tamil screenwriters
20th-century Indian male actors
21st-century Indian male actors
Screenwriters from Tamil Nadu